Dominik Małachowski was a 16th-century Roman Catholic archbishops from Poland.

Born into the Grzymała noble family  He was a Dominican friar, doctor of theology, prior of the monastery in Cracow, Auxiliary Bishop of Kraków from the year 1527–1544.

He was also titular bishop of Laodicea in Phrygia on 3 April 1527. In 1530 he participated in the coronation of King Sigismund Augustus.

He died on 15 March 1544. Buried in the Basilica of St. Trinity (on the gravestone is given the date of death, 1539.

References

16th-century births
1565 deaths
Polish nobility
16th-century Roman Catholic archbishops in Poland
Archbishops of Lviv
Canons of Kraków